Elnora can refer to:

In places
 Elnora, Alberta, in Red Deer County, Alberta, Canada
 Elnora, Indiana, in Daviess County, Indiana, United States

In people
 Elnora Monroe Babcock (1852–1934), American suffragist